Sengeerai  is a village in the Arimalamrevenue block of Pudukkottai district, Tamil Nadu, India.

Demographics 

As per the 2001 census, Sengeerai had a total population of 3016 with 1480 males and 1536 females. Out of the total population 1685 people were literate.

References

Villages in Pudukkottai district